The 2006–07 Marist Red Foxes women's basketball team represented Marist College during the 2006–07 NCAA Division I women's basketball season. The Red Foxes, led by fifth year head coach Brian Giorgis, played their home games at the McCann Center and were members of the Metro Atlantic Athletic Conference. They finished the season 29–6 overall, 17–1 in MAAC play to finish in first place to win the MAAC regular season title. In the MAAC women's basketball tournament, they defeated No. 8 seed Manhattan in the quarterfinals, No. 5 seed Siena in the semifinals, and No. 2 seed Iona in the championship game to win the tournament, and earned the conference's automatic bid to the NCAA women's tournament. As a No. 13 seed, they upset No. 4 seed and eighth-ranked Ohio State 67–63 in the First Round, upset No. 5 seed and 17th ranked Middle Tennessee State 73–59 in the Second Round before falling to No. 1 seed, and 3rd ranked Tennessee, 46–65 in the Sweet Sixteen.

Preview
Since Brian Giorgis took over the head coaching position at Marist four years prior, the Red Foxes compiled a record of 78–41 overall, and 52–20 in MAAC play. In those four seasons, Marist has won the MAAC regular season crown three times, and been to the NCAA Tournament twice. The team returned first team All-MAAC selection Meg Dahlman, third team All-MAAC selection, and MAAC defensive player of the year, Alisa Kresge, and MAAC All-Rookie team selection Julianne Vianni. Despite this, Iona was the preseason favorite to win it all, while Marist was picked second.

Roster

Schedule

|-
!colspan=9 style=|Regular Season

|-
!colspan=9 style=| MAAC Women's Tournament

|-
!colspan=9 style=| NCAA tournament

See also
 2006–07 Marist Red Foxes men's basketball team

References

Marist Red Foxes women's basketball seasons
Marist
2006–07 NCAA Division I women's basketball season